William Dodsworth (1798–1861) was an English cleric of the Church of England, a Tractarian who became a Roman Catholic lay writer.

Life
Dodsworth received his education at Trinity College, Cambridge, where he was admitted in October 1815. He graduated B.A. in 1820, and M.A. in 1823. He took orders in the Church of England, and at first held evangelical views.

Dodsworth became in 1829 minister of Margaret Street Chapel, Cavendish Square, London, where he was a popular preacher. By about 1835 he identified with the Tractarians. In 1837 he was appointed perpetual curate of Christ Church, St. Pancras, London. After the judgment in the Gorham case, he resigned his preferment, and joined the Roman Catholic church in January 1851.

Being married, Dodsworth could not take orders  as a Catholic priest. After his conversion he led a quiet  life as a layman of that community. He died in York Terrace, Regent's Park, on 10 December 1861, leaving several children by his wife Elizabeth, youngest sister of Lord Churston.

Works
Among Dodsworth's works were:

 Advent Lectures, London 1837.
 A few Comments on Dr. Pusey's Letter to the Bishop of London, London (three editions), 1851.
 Further Comments on Dr. Pusey's renewed Explanation, London 1851.
 Anglicanism considered in its results, London 1851.
 Popular Delusions concerning the Faith and Practice of Catholics, London 1857. 
 Popular Objections to Catholic Faith and Practice considered, London 1858.

Notes

Attribution

1798 births
1861 deaths
19th-century English Anglican priests
Tractarians
Anglican priest converts to Roman Catholicism
English Anglo-Catholics
Anglo-Catholic clergy